The 1952 Istanbul Football League or 1952 Istanbul Professional Football League was the 42nd season of the league and the first season in the professional era. Beşiktaş won the league for the 12th time.

Season

References

Istanbul Football League seasons
Turkey
1951–52 in Turkish football